Nuclear electronics is a subfield of electronics concerned with the design and use of high-speed electronic systems for nuclear physics and elementary particle physics research, and for industrial and medical use.

Essential elements of such systems include fast detectors for charged particles, discriminators for separating them by energy, counters for counting the pulses produced by individual particles, fast logic circuits (including coincidence and veto gates), for identification of particular types of complex particle events, and pulse height analyzers (PHAs) for sorting and counting gamma rays or particle interactions by energy, for spectral analysis.

Elementary components
Some of the essential components that make up the elements of a nuclear electronic analysis system include:

 Detectors
Bias voltage supplies
 Preamplifiers
 Discriminators
 Coincidence and veto logic gates.
 Counters
 Pulse height analyzers

These elements were originally developed and built in the laboratories of the scientists doing the pioneering work in the field, but are nowadays designed, developed, and manufactured by a variety of specialized vendors:

 EG&G Ortec
 Oxford Instruments
 Stanford Research Systems
 Tennelec

See also
 Nuclear Instrumentation Module

External links
   Nuclear electronics college class.

Electronics
Nuclear technology